The Radical SR3 is a race and sports car produced by Radical Sportscars, which has been built in Peterborough since 2002. The vehicle is considered a further development of the Clubsport 1100.

History
Designed by race car designer Mike Pilbeam, the SR3 is considered Radical's most successful model with over 1,100 units sold. The vehicle was originally developed for participation in international competitions in the C3 class of the FIA. In 2009, a further developed version of the Radical SR3 was presented. For the variant called Radical SR3 SL ( for "Street Legal" ), street legal for small series vehicles is also available.

In Autumn 2014, Radical presented a revised version of the racing version with the SR3 RSX.

Specifications
The aerodynamic downforce allows cornering acceleration of up to 2 g at high speed. A roof or trunk is not available for the car. The racing bucket seats help to save weight. The SR3 can be ordered as left-hand or right-hand drive.

The engine from the Suzuki Hayabusa 1300 is used in the SR3 RS 1300, SR3 RS 1500 Turbo and SR3 RSX. The 2.0 L I4 Ford EcoBoost engine from the Focus ST powers the SR3 SL. The SR3 delivers . Since a heater is required to be street legal, it is installed in the SR3 SL. It also has footwell lighting and a 12-volt socket.

References

6. ^ "https://www.carfolio.com/radical-sr3-117733" Retrieved 19-11-2022

External links
 Official website

Rear mid-engine, rear-wheel-drive vehicles
Cars of England
Sports cars
Cars introduced in 2002
2010s cars
2020s cars